St Cawrdaf's Church is a church in the village of Llangoed, Isle of Anglesey, Wales. The building dates from the 17th century and underwent renovations in the 19th century. It was designated a Grade II-listed building on 30 January 1968.

References

External links
Artworks at St Cawrdaf's Church, Llangoed

Llangoed
Llangoed